Werner Keller may refer to::

Werner Keller (writer), German writer and literary scientist
Werner Keller (politician), Canadian politician